Chief Deputy is a rank/title used in American/Canadian law enforcement. The position of chief deputy is primarily found within sheriff's offices throughout the United States, and also exists for marshals’ police departments as well as constables’ departments. A chief deputy may serve as the senior ranking officer below the sheriff, or below an undersheriff if that rank/title exists within an agency. Chief deputies may also be above undersheriffs depending on the sheriff's department, and in some cases the titles are synonymously used to describe the same individual.

Responsibilities 
The responsibilities of the individual(s) with this rank vary between agencies. However, the vast majority of departments employ the title for one of two roles, either the second-highest member of the department tasked with day-to-day operations (similar to a chief of police in agencies with a non-elected chief executive) or the commander of a large organizational element within the agency (called a "bureau" or "division" in most departments).

Below is a list of selected agencies that use the title and information regarding their use of the rank:

Police ranks
American deputy sheriffs